Karen Juanita Boyonas Gallman-Garton (born September 27, 1992) is a Filipino-Australian beauty pageant titleholder who in was the first Filipina to win the Miss Intercontinental pageant in 2018.

Early life and education
Gallman was born in Bohol, Philippines to Gavin Gallman Sr., an Australian World War II veteran and Editha Boyonas, a Filipino school teacher. Speaking both Bisaya and Tagalog, Karen and the family moved to Brisbane, Australia in the year 2000. She finished her secondary at Olivarez College. She obtained her bachelor's degree in Business Management majoring in International Business at the University of Queensland. Upon graduating Karen secured a graduate role with a management consulting firm in London, England.

Pageantry

Binibining Pilipinas 2012
Gallman was a candidate at the Binibining Pilipinas 2012 competition, representing the province of Bohol and finishing in the Top 12.

Binibining Pilipinas 2018
Gallman competed in the Binibining Pilipinas 2018 competition held at the Araneta Coliseum in Manila, Philippines where she was crowned Binibining Pilipinas Intercontinental 2018 by the outgoing queen, Katarina Rodriguez.

Miss Intercontinental 2018
Gallman represented the Philippines in the Miss Intercontinental 2018 pageant held at the Mall of Asia Arena, Manila where she was crowned Miss Intercontinental 2018 by outgoing queen Veronica Salas Vallejo of Mexico. Competing against more than 80 other contestants from around the globe, Karen became the 1st Filipina to win the Miss Intercontinental crown in the pageants 47-year history. During the final question and answer portion, all the contestants were asked the same question by the host: "How do you define success?" She answered:
"For me, success is not just about winning in life but setting goals, smaller goals, and achieving your dreams and working hard for everything you want, and always looking up to God and being thankful for everything. For me, that is success."

Gallman was personally congratulated by the  former President of the Philippines and Mayor of Manila when she paid a courtesy call on Joseph Estrada at the latter's office in Manila City Hall. She was also congratulated by the governor of Bohol and the mayor of her hometown in Ubay, Bohol.

Personal life
On March 3, 2020, Gallman married her longtime boyfriend Ian Garton.

On December 9, 2020, she gave birth to her first child.

References

External links

1992 births
Australian people of Filipino descent
Australian female models
Binibining Pilipinas winners
Filipino female models
Filipino people of Australian descent
People from Bohol
People from Brisbane
Living people